Vasik is both a given name and a surname. Vašík is a nickname for the Slavic male name Václav. 

Notable people with the name include:

Cassandra Vasik, Canadian country singer-songwriter
Vasik Rajlich (born 1971), American chess player